Heliconia episcopalis is a species of plant in the family Heliconiaceae. It is an erect herb typically grows up to 2 meters tall, native to the Amazon Rainforest, in Colombia, Venezuela, Guyana, French Guiana, Suriname, Brazil, Ecuador, and Peru in South America.

Uses
Heliconia episcopalis is a popular ornamental plant in hot regions with a humid climate.

References

External links
 Heliconia episcopalis observations on iNaturalist

episcopalis
Flora of Brazil
Flora of Colombia
Flora of Venezuela
Flora of Guyana
Flora of French Guiana
Flora of Suriname
Flora of Ecuador
Flora of Peru
Garden plants
Plants described in 1829